Liangshuikou Town is an urban town in Sangzhi County, Zhangjiajie, Hunan Province, China.

Administrative division
The town is divided into 16 villages and 1 community, the following areas: Nanmugang Community, Chayuanta Village, Quanmenkou Village, Bajiaowan Village, Tanmuta Village, Shengjipo Village, Xiejiapo Village, Yao'erping Village, Pengjiatai Village, Zhangjiata Village, Hanjiaping Village, Lijiazhuang Village, Xiajiayu Village, Maliuwan Village, Yulanxi Village, renshengping Village, and Sicengjie Village (楠木岗社区、茶元塔村、泉门口村、芭蕉湾村、檀木塔村、生基坡村、谢家坡村、尧儿坪村、彭家台村、张家塔村、韩家坪村、李家庄村、夏家峪村、麻六湾村、渔兰溪村、人生坪村、四层界村).

References

External links

Divisions of Sangzhi County
Towns of Hunan